The Kraul Mountains are a chain of mountains and nunataks that trend northeastward from Veststraumen Glacier for approximately  in western Queen Maud Land, Antarctica. They were discovered by the Third German Antarctic Expedition (1938–1939), led by Captain Alfred Ritscher, and named for Captain Otto Kraul, ice pilot of the expedition.

References

Mountain ranges of Queen Maud Land
Princess Astrid Coast